The 1944 Rice Owls football team was an American football team that represented Rice University as a member of the Southwest Conference (SWC) during the 1944 college football season. In its fifth season under head coach Jess Neely, the team compiled a 5–6 record (2–3 against SWC opponents) and was outscored by a total of 163 to 143.

Schedule

References

Rice
Rice Owls football seasons
Rice Owls football